Légende du Scorpion à Quatre Queues ("Legend of the Four-Tailed Scorpion") is the second and last album to date by the experimental dub group De Facto, released in November 2001.

Track listing 
"Legend of the Four-Tailed Scorpion" – 3:02
"Mattilious Creed" – 0:17
"AMKHZ" – 3:16
"Hoxadrine (Live)" – 8:58
"Muerte Inoxia" – 3:48
"Vesica Pisces (Live)" – 7:13
"Cordova" – 5:16
"120E7 (Original Version)" – 4:49
"Exit Template" – 2:30

Personnel 
Omar Rodríguez-López – bass
Cedric Bixler-Zavala – drums
Isaiah "Ikey" Owens – keyboards
Jeremy Ward – sound manipulation, melodica
Mitchel Edward Klik – vocals on tracks 1 & 9

References 
 https://web.archive.org/web/20120227033610/http://defacto.bandcamp.com/album/l-gende-du-scorpion-quatre-queues

De Facto (band) albums
2001 albums